Vilim "Vili" Matula (born 5 March 1962) is a Croatian actor, director, civil activist and politician. He has been described as one of the most prominent Croatian actors of all time, as well as new representative in the Croatian Parliament for green-left coalition We Can!. 

He is known for starring in films and television series including Croatian and Yugoslav cult classics S.P.U.K. (1983), Tranquilizer Gun (1997), Is It Clear, My Friend? (2000), Infection (2003), 100 Minutes of Glory (2004) and Long Dark Night (2004). He has also appeared in major international productions including Wallenberg: A Hero's Story (1985), Schindler's List (1993) and Rosencrantz & Guildenstern Are Dead (1990). He is a drama champion in the Kerempuh Satirical Theatre in Zagreb.

Early life
Matula finished elementary and high school in Zagreb and was a member of the College of the Zagreb Youth Theatre. In 1978, Matula started his own theatre group, "Domaći" two years before enrolling in the Academy of Dramatic Art. After graduating in 1985, he became a member of Zagreb's Comedy Theatre. In 1988, he co-founded Zagreb's Acting Studio intended for developing acting skills by applying different techniques and methods (the Strasberg Method, the Chekhov Technique and the psychological gesture, Meyerhold's Biomechanics, the Alexander Technique, etc.). 

In 1993, he attended the Summer Acting Programme at the Royal National Theatre in London. From 1987 to 1997, he was employed at the drama ensemble of the Zagreb Youth Theatre (ZKM). In 1997, he became an independent artist.

Career
In 2000, he participated in the launching of the Boal Forum Theatre in response to an invitation by theatrologist and feminist critic Nataša Govedić. The theatre was shared with war victims, refugees, ethnic minorities as well as LGBT+ citizens. In 2001, he started his collaboration with Damir Bartol Indoš and The House of Extreme Music Theatre – Kugla (Swinging, Man-Wolf, Chinese Roulette, Green, Green, iCefas).

In 2008, he appeared in the Metastases play adaptation, for which he won Marul and a Croatian Theatre Award. For the supporting role, he was nominated for an Apollo Prize at the Belgrade Culture Festival.

On film, Matula is perhaps best known for his roles in Tranquilizer Gun, Is It Clear, My Friend?, Infection, 100 Minutes of Glory, Long Dark Night and Šuma summarum. For his role in the Matanić-directed 100 Minutes of Glory, Matula was named Best Supporting Actor at the Pula Film Festival, winning the Golden Arena.

He has also appeared in major international productions including the Emmy-winning Wallenberg: A Hero's Story, starring Richard Chamberlain, the critically and commercially acclaimed Spielberg historical drama Schindler's List (1993) and the 1990 Rosencrantz & Guildenstern Are Dead, starring Gary Oldman and Tim Roth. The latter seen Matula portray the complex Horatio and alongside Matula, several Croatian actors appeared as the tragedians. Those include Mladen Vasary, Željko Vukmirica, Livio Badurina and Sven Medvešek.

His television repertoire includes guest roles on Zakon!, Naša mala klinika and Žutokljunac. He has also filmed and produced several television specials and shorts for the Motovun Film Festival.

Matula has recorded several hundred radio dramas. His spoken word discography includes reciting August Šenoa, Ivan Goran Kovačić, Ante Kovačić, Vladimir Nazor and Miroslav Krleža. He has also provided vocals for the Punk Cabaret album by Stanislav Kovačić, on three songs. In animation, he has voiced several characters on the Croatian-American venture The Elm-Chanted Forest. In Croatian dubs, he voiced Chum in the Croatian dub of Finding Nemo (2003) and Sterling in Cars 3 (2017).

Matula is one of the most awarded Croatian actors in history. Among other accolades, he has also won two Croatian Theatre Awards, two Orlando Awards, three Marul Awards and five Golden Laughter Awards.

Selected filmography

Television

Film

Awards 
 1988: Orestija Award for Orestija
 1989: Dubravko Dujšin, Veljko Maričić and Golden Laughter Award for the play Dekadencija
 1998: Veljko Maričić, Mila Dimitrijević, Vladimir Nazor and Croatian Theatre Award for Best Actor and Best Monodrama for "Münchhausen"
 2004: Golden Arena for Best Supporting Actor
 2008: Marul and a Croatian Theatre Award for his supporting role in Metastases
 2010: Marul and Golden Laughter Award at the Kerempuh Satire Festival for Balon
 2010: Orlando Award at the Dubrovnik Summer Festival for his lead role in Gogol's Revizor
 2019: Apollo Prize and the Marul Award for Best Actor in Govori glasnije!

Politics

In youth 
Matula has been involved in politics in different forms since his late teens. He was a member of the League of Communists of Croatia, as well as delegate in the 11th and final convention of the Central Committee of the League of Communist of Croatia, which resulted in the first democratic elections in 1989 the Socialist Republic of Croatia, then part of SFR Yugoslavia.

In adulthood 
Matula has since taken part in several civil initiatives, numerous demonstrations and always active in the fight against gentrification and the seizing of public spaces in Zagreb including local movement of Right to the city called PravoNaGRAD, but also a vocal critic of structural problems in society like corruption and neo-fascism. He's one of the founders of the Actor's union, of which he was also a president. Matula is a member of the coordinating committee of  Zagreb is OURS! (Zagreb je NAŠ!) the progressive citizen platform that registered as a green-municipalist party. In the Zagreb municipal elections in 2017, Matula entered as a candidate in the borough council of Donji grad in Central Zagreb as vice president. His reports included council suppression, corruptive and manipulative behavior of city authorities. In 2019 he became a founding member of the citizen platform We can! (Možemo!) that formed a green-left coalition for the 2020 parliamentary election where is presented as one of the candidates. He got elected in the Croatian Parliament together with 6 other members of the Coalition.

Calling out by right-wing 
Politically active as actor, unionist and activist, Matula is well known for his support for centre-left/green politics, including civil and LGBT rights, as well as periodically being called out in populist-right-wing portal Narod.HR
or in responses of conservative Vecernji.HR, for being against WW2 pro-fascist official Enver Čolaković, to be awarded a street name as part of populist coalition trade-offs in Zagreb Assembly. In 2017, Matula signed the Declaration on the Common Language of the Croats, Serbs, Bosniaks and Montenegrins.

References

External links 

 Biography on the website of Kerempuh Satirical Theater

1962 births
Living people
Male actors from Zagreb
21st-century Croatian male actors
20th-century Croatian male actors
Croatian actor-politicians
Croatian male actors
Croatian male television actors
Croatian male film actors
Croatian male stage actors
Croatian male voice actors
Croatian theatre directors
Croatian comedians
Croatian dramatists and playwrights
Croatian Theatre Award winners
Vladimir Nazor Award winners
Signatories of the Declaration on the Common Language
Croatian LGBT rights activists
Representatives in the modern Croatian Parliament
Politicians from Zagreb
Theatre people from Zagreb